Gorna Banjica is a village in the municipality of Gostivar, North Macedonia.

History
According to the 1467-68 Ottoman defter, the village had 17 houses, with the inhabitants having a mixed Slavic-Albanian anthroponymy - usually a Slavic first name and an Albanian last name or last names with Albanian patronyms and Slavic suffixes, (e.g Nikolla Arbanas (t.Arnaut); Progon, son of Tanush; Jovan,son of Prenk'').
A policy of Turkification of the Albanian population was employed by the Yugoslav authorities in cooperation with the Turkish government, stretching the period of 1948-1959.  Starting in 1948, Turkish schools were opened in areas with large Albanian majorities, such as Gorna Banjica and Dolna Banjica

Demographics 
As of the 2021 census, Gorna Banjica had 3,436 residents with the following ethnic composition:
Turks 1,503
Macedonians 839
Albanians 811
Roma 610
Persons for whom data are taken from administrative sources 107
Others 16

According to the 2002 census, the village had a total of 4,423 inhabitants. Ethnic groups in the village include:

Albanians 1,636
Turks 1,243
Macedonians 1,196
Romani 315
Serbs 4 
Others 29

References

External links

Villages in Gostivar Municipality
Albanian communities in North Macedonia